Because of Romek: A Holocaust Survivor's Memoir is a book written by David Faber. The book chronicles the events in the life of Faber and the horrors of living in Nazi concentration camps. All of Faber's family was killed except his sister who was in England at the time. Faber's brother, Romek (a nickname), was a Polish soldier and a prisoner of war in Buchenwald. After his release from Buchenwald, he was active in the Polish Underground. Romek was eventually caught and tortured for information before he was murdered in front of his brother Faber.

Review
Sonia Eliot of the San Diego Reader wrote:

See also
The Holocaust
Buchenwald concentration camp
Polish Underground State

References

External links
Because of Romek (Archived from the original on 12 March 2007)
Buchenwald: Photos From the Liberation of the Camp, April 1945 (Images from LIFE.com)

Personal accounts of the Holocaust